Mauro Rafael da Silva (born 20 May 1984) is a Brazilian footballer who plays as a forward.

Career
Born in Sapucaia do Sul, Rio Grande do Sul, Mauro started his career with RS Futebol Clube. He signed a 5-year contract in September 2001. Mauro played in 2003 Campeonato Brasileiro Série C and scored 4 goals in 2004 Campeonato Gaúcho Segunda Divisão. In mid-2004 he was signed by Fluminense and played 10 times in 2004 Campeonato Brasileiro Série A. In August 2005, he extended his contract with club until November 2007. He then transferred to Lausanne-Sport along with team-mate Marco Balthazar in February 2006. He failed to play any matches in Swiss Super League. In September 2009, he was signed by Novo Hamburgo for 2009 Copa FGF. In December 2009 he signed a 1-year contract with Caxias along with former RS team-mate Marcos Rogério. He played for the team at 2010 Campeonato Gaúcho and played once in 2010 Campeonato Brasileiro Série C.

South China
On 27 September 2012, South China chairman Steven Lo announced that Mauro joined the club for an undisclosed fee and is given shirt number 33. Mauro made his debut as a second half sub against Tai Po on 7 October 2012.

On 1 February 2013, Mauro was released by the club.

References

External links
 CBF 
 Futpedia 
 

Brazilian footballers
Esporte Clube Pelotas players
Fluminense FC players
FC Lausanne-Sport players
Esporte Clube Novo Hamburgo players
Sociedade Esportiva e Recreativa Caxias do Sul players
Association football forwards
Brazilian expatriate footballers
Expatriate footballers in Switzerland
Brazilian expatriate sportspeople in Switzerland
Sportspeople from Rio Grande do Sul
South China AA players
1984 births
Living people